Engelsman or Engelschman is a Dutch toponymic surname meaning "Englishman", suggesting an origin in England. People with this name include:

Bartholomeus Engelsman,  Dutch name for Bartholomeus Anglicus (beg.1203–1272), French music theorist and entomologist
Han Engelsman (1919–1990), Dutch footballer
Henk Engelsman (1914–1979), Dutch Labour Party politician
Jan Maertz Engelsman (1593–1654), Dutch glass painter and member of the Hoorn city council
Michelle Engelsman (born 1979), Australian freestyle swimmer
 (1913–1988), Dutch stage actor, LGBT rights activist and World War II resistance member

References

Dutch-language surnames
Dutch toponymic surnames